Manitou Island may refer to:

Manitou Island (Lake Superior), a small island off the eastern tip of the Michigan's Keweenaw Peninsula
Manitou Island (Wisconsin), one of the Apostle Islands on Lake Superior
The Manitou Islands, in Lake Michigan near the Michigan's Leelanau Peninsula consisting of 
North Manitou Island 
South Manitou Island
Manitou Island (White Bear Lake), Minnesota
Manitou Island (Mackenzie River), Northwest Territories across the Mackenzie River from Fort Good Hope

Manitou Islands may refer to:
Manitou Islands (Lake Nipissing), a series of small islands in Lake Nipissing in Ontario, Canada